This is a list of finance ministers of Togo.

 Hospice Coco, 1958 - 1963
 Antoine Meatchi, 1963 - 1966
 Boukari Djobo, 1966
 Benoit Bedou, 1966 - 1967
 Boukari Djobo, 1967 - 1969
 Jean Têvi, 1969 - 1973
 Edem Kodjo, 1973 - 1977
 Yao Grunitzky, 1977 - 1978
 Tété Têvi Benissan, 1978 - 1984
 Komlan Alipui, 1984 - 1988
 Yaovi Adodo, 1988 - 1990
 Komlan Alipui, 1990 - 1991
 Elias Kwassivi Kpetigo, 1991 - 1993
 Franck Fianyo, 1993 - 1994
 Elom Emile Dadzie, 1994 - 1996
 Barry Moussa Barque, 1996 - 1999
 Abdoul-Hamid Segoun Tidjani Dourodjaye, 1999 - 2000
 Tankpadja Lalle, 2000 - 2002
 Kossi Assimaidou, 2002
 Ayawovi Demba Tignokpa, 2002 - 2003
 Débaba Bale, 2003 - 2005
 Payadowa Boukpessi, 2005 - 2007
 Adji Otèth Ayassor, 2007 - 2016
 Sani Yaya, 2016 - incumbent

References

Finance
Finance Ministers
Politicians